Iryna Yanovych (born 14 July 1976) is a Ukrainian track cyclist who competed at the 2000 Summer Olympics in Sydney, winning a bronze medal in the sprint event.

External links
 
 

1976 births
Living people
People from Amur Oblast
Ukrainian female cyclists
Cyclists at the 2000 Summer Olympics
Olympic cyclists of Ukraine
Olympic bronze medalists for Ukraine
Olympic medalists in cycling
Medalists at the 2000 Summer Olympics
Sportspeople from Amur Oblast